The Rivière du Pilet is a tributary of Chigoubiche River, flowing in the unorganized territory of Lac-Ashuapmushuan, in the Le Domaine-du-Roy Regional County Municipality, in the administrative region of Saguenay–Lac-Saint-Jean, in province of Quebec, in Canada.

The valley of the Pilet river is mainly served by the forest road R0211 which goes up this valley to the Couleuvre lake where it curves towards the east to go to serve the upper part of the Vermillon River passing between Viau and Moïse lakes. This route connects north to route 167.

Forestry (mainly forestry) is the main economic activity in this valley; secondly, recreational tourism activities, mainly because of the Ashuapmushuan Wildlife Reserve.

Geography 
The Pilet river draws its source from Lake Odilon.

This lake is located in a mountainous area in the unorganized territory of Lac-Ashuapmushuan, at:
  north-east of the course of the Trenche River;
  south-east of the mouth of the Pilet river;
  south of the railway;
  southwest of the course of the Ashuapmushuan River.

  north, crossing a marsh area, then crossing Lac du Pilet which comprises a narrow peninsula attached to the east shore, up to its mouth;
  first to the northeast, crossing Lake Jouvin, to Lac Couleuvre over its full length; then to the north-west crossing the latter lake, entering a deep valley, collecting the discharge (coming from the east) of Lac de la Tente and the discharge (coming from the west) of Lake Fougaron, up to at the landfill (coming from the east of Béland, Beaucaire and Gérard lakes);
  towards the north-west, collecting the discharge (coming from the south) of the Loffre lake, the discharge (coming from the west) of the Minet lake, as well as the discharge (coming from the (east) of the Congénères lakes, to the discharge (coming from the east) of the Noël and Rustan lakes;
  towards the northwest relatively in a straight line, crossing route 167 at the end of the segment, up to its mouth.

The Pilet river flows on the south bank of the Chigoubiche River. This confluence is located upstream of a series of rapids, and at:
  east of Chigoubiche Lake;
  south-west of the mouth of the Chigoubiche River;
  northwest of downtown Saint-Félicien.

Toponymy 
The term "Pilet" turns out to be a species of duck from periartic regions. This term also turns out to be a family patronymic. designated in America "Pilet dit Jolicoeur" The descendants of this surname have come together in a family association.

The toponym “rivière du Pilet” was made official on December 5, 1968, at the Place Names Bank of the Commission de toponymie du Québec.

See also 

 List of rivers of Quebec

References 

Rivers of Saguenay–Lac-Saint-Jean
Le Domaine-du-Roy Regional County Municipality